The Black Elster or Schwarze Elster is a  long river in eastern Germany, in the states Saxony, Brandenburg and Saxony-Anhalt, right tributary of the Elbe. Its source is in the Upper Lusatia region, near Elstra.

The Black Elster flows through the cities Kamenz, Hoyerswerda, Senftenberg, Lauchhammer, Elsterwerda, Bad Liebenwerda, Herzberg and Jessen. It flows into the river Elbe at Elster (Elbe), upstream from Wittenberg.

Geography 
From here the Black Elster flows initially in a northerly direction through Elstra, Kamenz, Milstrich and Wittichenau; from Hoyerswerda it flows in westwards to Elsterheide. Further downstream, after , it crosses the Saxon-Brandenburg border and flows through Senftenberg, Ruhland and  Lauchhammer to Elsterwerda. From here it heads in a northwesterly direction through Bad Liebenwerda, Herzberg and Jessen before emptying into the Elbe in the municipality of Elster (Elbe) (river kilometre 198.5).

The most important tributaries of the Black Elster are the Hoyerswerdaer Schwarzwasser, the Pulsnitz, the Große Röder, the Kleine Elster and the Schweinitzer Fließ.

Tributaries

History 
Field Marshal Blücher crossed the Elbe River near its confluence with the Black Elster on 3 Oct 1813 on his march to Leipzig.

See also 
 There is also a White Elster river in eastern Germany.
 List of rivers of Brandenburg
 List of rivers of Saxony
 List of rivers of Saxony-Anhalt

References

 
Rivers of Brandenburg
Rivers of Saxony
Rivers of Saxony-Anhalt
Geography of Lusatia
Rivers of Germany